Aleksandr Alekseyevich Moiseyev (born 16 April 1962) is an officer of the Russian Navy. He currently holds the rank of admiral, and is commander in chief of the Northern Fleet.

After initially training in film repair, Moiseyev underwent military service, before studying at the navy's technical institute. From there he joined the Northern Fleet as a submariner. After starting in the engineering branch, he moved into specialising in combat and warfare control.  Commended for his service and promoted, he took command of his own boat, from which he performed the first commercial space launch in the navy's history, as well as the first commercial payload that had ever been sent into orbit from a submarine. He undertook further study at the Naval Academy and the Military Academy of the General Staff, interspersed with the command of submarine squadrons. He received plaudits for his supervisory roles, and was awarded the title of Hero of the Russian Federation in 2011.

In 2018 he took command of the Black Sea Fleet, and oversaw a period of expansion within the fleet. He has also courted controversy with regards to relations with Ukraine following the Russian military intervention in Ukraine from 2014 onwards, and the Kerch Strait incident in November 2018. In May 2019 he was appointed commander of the Northern Fleet.

Early career
He attended high school and a specialist film school in Sovetsk, Kaliningrad Oblast, and then worked as a technician in a film repair shop in the city of Berezniki, Perm Oblast. He then joined the Northern Fleet, where he would spend the next 29 years, initially as an engineer on nuclear-powered submarines, and rising by the end to the post of commander of the fleet's submarine squadron.

Submariner
From June 1987 he was part of the computer engineering division, and from September 1990, head of the electronic warfare division. In February 1992 he became senior assistant commander for combat aboard the K-117 Bryansk. From July to October 1994 he was senior assistant to the commander of the Project 667BDRM Delfin-class ballistic missile submarine K-18 Karelia. While serving in this post, he participated in a voyage to the North Pole, where the submarine surfaced and on Russia's Navy Day, raised the St. Andrew and Russian flags on the ice. For his part in this Moiseyev was awarded the Order of Courage. Between 1994 and 1995 he took the navy's Higher Special Officer Classes and later commanded the ballistic missile submarine K-407 Novomoskovsk. On 7 July 1998 the submarine launched two German commercial micro-satellites Tubsat-N and Tubsat-N1 using the Shtil' carrier rocket, while submerged in the Barents Sea. This was, according to Space Today Online, "the first time a commercial payload had ever been sent from Earth into orbit from a submarine and the first commercial space launch in the history of the Russian Navy".

In 2008 he was senior officer aboard the  during her transfer from the Northern Fleet to the Pacific Fleet, spending long periods submerged beneath the Arctic ice. For this feat he was awarded a second Order of Courage. He enrolled in the Military Academy of the General Staff in 2009, graduating in 2011 with first class honours and the distinction of a gold medal. On 14 February 2011 he was awarded the title of Hero of the Russian Federation. In the awards ceremony on 21 February, President of the Russian Federation Dmitry Medvedev announced  "The Gold Star of the Hero of Russia is awarded to Alexander Alekseevich Moiseyev, commander of the strategic division of submarines of the Northern Fleet. During his combat patrols, under his leadership, tests of the newest weapons were successfully conducted and a whole series of rocket launches were carried out. As Supreme Commander, I watched these exercises. And, indeed, everything was done to a very high standard."

Flag rank and the Black Sea

In June 2011, Moiseyev was appointed Deputy Commander of the Northern Fleet's submarine forces, and in April 2012 he became their commander. Promoted to rear admiral on 20 February 2013, he served as a deputy to the Council of Deputies of Alexandrovsk, Murmansk Oblast, and on 5 April 2016 he was appointed Chief of Staff of the Northern Fleet. On 22 November 2017 he was appointed Deputy Chief of the General Staff of the Armed Forces of the Russian Federation, and on 14 May 2018 he became Acting Commander of the Black Sea Fleet, succeeding Admiral Aleksandr Vitko. He was confirmed in his post on 26 June 2018. He has been awarded the Order of Courage twice, as well as the Order of Military Merit and the Medal of the Order "For Merit to the Fatherland", second class. The Black Sea Fleet is currently undergoing expansion, and in 2019 he announced that six new combat ships and six support vessels would enter service with the fleet that year.

On 16 February 2019, Moiseyev was one of seven Russian personnel notified by investigators of Security Service of Ukraine of suspicion of "engaging in an aggressive war or aggressive military actions", relating to the Kerch Strait incident in November 2018. Colonel-General Aleksandr Dvornikov, Commander of the Southern Military District, was also one of those notified.  By a presidential decree on 3 May 2019, Moiseyev was appointed commander of the Northern Fleet, succeeding Admiral Nikolai Yevmenov, who has been appointed Commander-in-Chief of the Russian Navy. Moiseyev was promoted to the rank of admiral on 10 December 2020.

References

External links 
 

1962 births
Living people
People from Gvardeysky District
Soviet Navy personnel
Russian admirals
Heroes of the Russian Federation
Recipients of the Order of Courage
Recipients of the Order of Military Merit (Russia)
Recipients of the Medal of the Order "For Merit to the Fatherland" II class
N. G. Kuznetsov Naval Academy alumni
Military Academy of the General Staff of the Armed Forces of Russia alumni